Bufori is a brand of hand-built automobiles inspired by American 1930s coupes. The company is owned by three Australian Lebanese brothers Anthony, George and Gerry Khouri. In 1986, Gerry Khouri began to build three special sports cars in his garage, one each for the three brothers, which led to the formation of the company. The name Bufori is an acronym that stands for B – Beautiful, U – Unique, F – Funtastic, O – Original, R – Romantic, I – Irresistible.

The Bufori Motor Car Company Pty. Ltd. is a proprietary company limited by shares and registered in Australia, as is the Bufori Motor Car Company (M) Sdn. Bhd. in Malaysia. Originally, all of the manufacturing and sales operations were conducted in Australia, but in 1998 full production moved to new facilities in Kepong, a suburb of Kuala Lumpur, in Malaysia.

The production facility in Kuala Lumpur has an installed capacity of 300 vehicles per year, and the company employs 108 craftsmen. Each unit is built by hand using traditional techniques in a 25-step production process. The body of a Bufori is made out of carbon fibre and Kevlar composite material, which is light and ultra-strong. Every Bufori is made to order and can be customised according to the owner's wishes.

The Bufori MKI, MKII and MKIII La Joya are displayed at the Malaysian National Automotive Museum based at the Sepang International Circuit since 2003.

Current models

Bufori Geneva (2010 – present)

A four-door car defined as a "Luxury Saloon", which was introduced at the 2010 Geneva Motor Show (hence its name). It features a 6.1L Chrysler V8 engine producing 430 hp. The powertrain was later on updated to a 6.4L V8 producing 470 hp. The interior of the car is highly customisable. The rear centre console can accommodate an automatic coffee machine, a Chinese tea set with instant boiling water, a fridge, a cigar humidor or a mini-bar. The rear lounge seats are electrically adjustable and feature heating & cooling as well as a pneumatic massage device. The seatback trays are electrically actuated. The rear doors are rear-hinged (so-called "coach doors") and can be closed electrically by the press of a button. The car is also equipped with a thermal night-vision camera and an adjustable air suspension.

Bufori BMS R1 (2009 – present)

The Bufori BMS R1 is the race derivative of the Bufori CS road car that is still to be launched. The car is a joint effort between Bufori Motor Sports (BMS) and Axle Motorsports. The BMS R1 made its global racing debut at the 2009 Macau Grand Prix with Alex Yoong as its driver.

Bufori La Joya (2004 – present)

Two-seat coupe; 2.7L, V6, EFI, quad cam, water-cooled, mid-mounted engine; rear wheel drive; tiptronic transmission, 4-wheel independent suspension, Carbon Fibre and Kevlar composite body, spaceframe chassis, ABS, EBD, traction control, cruise control, Bluetooth set, tyre pressure monitoring system.

Former models

Bufori MK II – Series 1 and Series 2 (1992–2003)

Two- and 2+2-seat convertible with soft top or removable hard top; 1.8 – 2.2L, 4 cylinder, DOHC, EFI, water-cooled, rear-mounted Subaru boxer engine; rear wheel drive; automatic or manual transmission; 4-wheel independent suspension.

Bufori V6i (1992–1994)

2+2-seat convertible with retractable soft top; 3.8L, Buick V6, EFI, water-cooled, front-mounted engine; rear wheel drive; 4-wheel independent suspension.

Bufori MK I (1988–1992) 
Two-seat convertible with soft top; 1.6 – 2.1L, 4 cylinder, rear-mounted, twin carb, air-cooled, rear-mounted boxer engine; rear-wheel drive, automatic or manual transmission; 4-wheel independent suspension.

Bufori Madison (1986–1988)

Two-seat convertible with soft top; 1.6L, 4 cylinder, rear-mounted, air-cooled boxer engine; rear-wheel drive; manual transmission; 4-wheel independent suspension.

References

See also 
Official Bufori website
List of automobile manufacturers

Vehicle manufacturing companies established in 1986
Luxury motor vehicle manufacturers
Motor vehicle manufacturers of Malaysia
Retro-style automobiles
1986 establishments in Australia
Malaysian brands
Privately held companies of Malaysia
Manufacturing companies based in Kuala Lumpur